is the 18th studio album by Japanese entertainer Miho Nakayama. Released through King Records on June 1, 1996, it features the singles "Thinking About You (Anata no Yoru wo Tsutsumitai)" and "True Romance". Like her previous studio releases Mellow, Wagamama na Actress, Pure White, and Mid Blue, Deep Lip French was self-produced and recorded in Los Angeles.

The album peaked at No. 13 on Oricon's albums chart and sold over 80,000 copies.

Track listing

Personnel
 Miho Nakayama – vocals
 Yoko Kanno – piano (1, 4–5, 9)
 Yoshimasa Inoue – piano (1), backing vocals (6–7)
 Yoshihiro Tomonari – piano (3)
 Hidetoshi Yamada – piano (6–7)
 Daisaku Kume – piano (10)
 Kazuo Ōtani – piano (11)
 Hajime Mizoguchi – synthesizer (1, 4, 9), cello (5)
 Hiroshi Kitashiro  – synthesizer (2)
 Kanichirō Kubō – synthesizer (3)
 Hideki Matsutake – synthesizer (6–7)
 Hiroshi Shinkawa – synthesizer (8)
 Keitarō Takanami – synthesizer (10)
 Naoki Suzuki – synthesizer (11)
 Toshiyuki Honma – electric piano (6–7)
 Tsuneo Imahori – guitar (1, 9)
 Masayoshi Furukawa – guitar (4)
 Fujimaru Yoshino – guitar (6–7)
 Masaki Matsubara – guitar (8)
 Shigeharu Sasago – guitar (9)
 Kazuhiko Obata – guitar (9)
 Tenji Mitsuhata – guitar (11)
 Masayuki Suzuki – bass (1, 10)
 Kenji Takamizu – bass (4, 11)
 Chiharu Mikuzuki – bass (6)
 Hideo Watanabe – bass (9)
 Nobuo Eguchi – drums (7)
 Tōru Hasebe – drums (7)
 Ikuo Kakehashi – percussion (1, 9), drums (4)
 Tomo Yamaguchi – percussion (3)
 Makoto Hirabara – saxophone (1)
 Kazutoki Umezu – saxophone (3)
 Jake H. Concepcion – saxophone (6)
 Shinichirō Hikosaka – saxophone (9)
 Katsuki Tochio – saxophone (9)
 Sai Kakukawa – saxophone (9)
 Yasushi Arai – saxophone (9)
 Hideshi Toki – saxophone (11)
 Shin Sugawara – trumpet (1)
 Eijirō Nakagawa – trumpet (1)
 Masatsugu Shinozaki Group – strings (1, 4–5, 9, 11)
 Hiroyuki Koike Group – strings (6–7, 10)
 Megumi Maruo – accordion (10)
 Kōichirō Tashiro – charango (10)
 Maria – backing vocals (4)
 Naoki Takao – backing vocals (8, 11)
 Kumi Sasaki – backing vocals (11)

Charts

References

External links
 
 

1996 albums
Miho Nakayama albums
Japanese-language albums
King Records (Japan) albums